Guillermo Pomi (born in 1951) is a Uruguayan economist and diplomat.

He was Uruguayan ambassador to South Africa.

Since 2010 he has been Ambassador of Uruguay to Argentina.

References

Further reading
 
 
 "El Senado aprobó la venia del embajador Pomi en Argentina" 

1951 births
Uruguayan economists
Uruguayan diplomats
Ambassadors of Uruguay to South Africa
Ambassadors of Uruguay to Argentina
Living people